Bellampalli is a town in Mancherial district of the Indian state of Telangana.  It is a municipality and mandal headquarters of Bellampalli mandal of Bellampalli revenue division.

Spellings 
Alternative spellings are Bellampalle and Bellampally.

History 
Bellampalli is noted for its coal mines belonging to Singareni Collieries Company Limited. Bellampalli has the most coal mines and opencast mines in the state of Telangana. The first coal mine was established in 1936 by the British government. Later, the town developed very rapidly with the discovery and excavation of many more coal mines. The coal production from the  SCCL is catering to the needs of the National Thermal Power Corporation, Ramagundam and many surrounding industrial buildings such as cement plants in Devapur, steel factory in Visakhapatnam and power plants in Maharashtra

Demographics 
According to the 2001 India census, Bellampalli had a population of 66,660. Males constitute 51% of the population and females 49%. Bellampalli has an literacy rate of 66%, higher than the national average of 60%, with 57% of the males and 43% of females literate. 11% of the population is under 6 years of age.

Government and politics

Civic administration 

Bellampalle Municipality was constituted in 1987 and is classified as a second grade municipality with 23 election wards.

Politics 

Bellampalli has been a traditional stronghold and birthplace of the CPI, also known as the Communist Party of India.
CPI leader Gunda Mallesh won the MLA seat for Bellampally in the 2009 elections. Gunda Mallesh is a senior politician from Bellampally and the CPI. The former MLA's of this of constituency are Amurajula Sreedevi and Pati Subadra. Bellampalli assembly constituency comes under Peddapalli Lok Sabha constituency. Suman Balka is present MP and he is a student of osmania university, Youth Wing President is Sahith Sharma.

MLA's of Bellampalli
 Sridevi (TDP)-2004
 Gunda Mallesh (CPI) -2009
 Durgam Chinnaih (TRS) -2014

Administravtive Division 
There are 13 Villages under Bellampalli.

Economy 
Coal production has been very important to the economic history of Bellampalli and it is thus known as an industrial town. A chemicals and fertilizer factory also lies in the town. However, the average income of Rs. 5000/- per capita according to 1989 figures mean that the average person is living in poverty.

Transport 

Bellampalli is well connected by road and train.

Bellampally railway station is one of the most oldest railway stations in Telangana region and it lies in Nagpur–Hyderabad line.

Bellampalli comes under south central railway and its 273 km distance towards North (Delhi route) from Hyderabad (Capital of the state)

Railway code: BPA

References 

 
Cities and towns in Mancherial district 
Mandal headquarters in Mancherial district